Savernake Low Level railway station was a station on the Berks and Hants Extension Railway, near the village of Burbage in Wiltshire, England. It was open from 1862 until 1966.

History

The site is directly above the Bruce Tunnel which carries the Kennet and Avon Canal.

There was a goods station at Burbage Wharf, about three-quarters of a mile to the west, providing an interchange between the railway, the canal and the road to Marlborough. This was closed in 1947.

When the Reading to Taunton line was created and the Stert to Westbury cut-off opened in 1900, the platforms at Savernake were lengthened, the footbridge roofed and brick waiting rooms provided on the down platform. In the 1950s Savernake had ten trains a day on the main line, seven to Marlborough and two other  Midland and South Western Junction Railway trains.

On 1 July 1924, the station was renamed Savernake Low Level; the nearby station on the former Midland and South Western Junction Railway line becoming  at the same time.

The station was renamed Savernake for Marlborough on 11 September 1961 when the High Level station officially closed, although through trains on the former M&SWJR had used Savernake Low Level for some time because of a landslip on the original line.

Routes

References

External links
Savernake Station on navigable O.S. map

Disused railway stations in Wiltshire
Former Great Western Railway stations
Railway stations in Great Britain opened in 1862
Railway stations in Great Britain closed in 1966
1862 establishments in England
Beeching closures in England